The Media Industry Development Authority of Fiji (MIDA) is an independent statutory body that regulates mass media in Fiji. The Authority was established in June 2010 by the Fijian government under the Media Industry Development Decree of 2010. It enforces media ethics which governs all media organizations in Fiji as well as regulating media content and implementing rules on advertising.

The Authority consists of a chairperson and five members which includes the Solicitor-General as well as four others representing the public, one representing consumers, one representing women, one representing children and a journalist representing the media industry. All members including the chairperson are appointed by the Attorney-General of Fiji and serves for 3 years.

Functions 
The Authority's functions include:

 to encourage, promote and facilitate the development of media organisations and media services in Fiji
 to advise and make recommendations to the Minister on matters, measures and regulations related to or connected with the media
 to facilitate the provision of a quality range of media services in Fiji which serves the national interest
 to ensure that media services in Fiji are maintained at a high standard in all respects and, in particular, in respect of the quality, balance, fair judgment and range of subject-matter of their content
 to ensure that nothing is included in the content of any media service which is against public interest or order, or national interest, or which offends against good taste or decency and creates communal discord
 to promote local content in print and broadcast media
 to perform such other matters as the Authority may determine to be in the interests of the media and in furtherance of the objects of this Decree.

Criticism 
Since it's establishment, the Authority has been subject to criticisms by opposition parties and prompted concerns from civil organizations. After the 2014 Fijian general election, the Multinational Observer Group in a report urged the Authority to review its penalties for ethical breaches and reiterated the need for an independent institution to monitor the Authority's actions. In 2017, Fiji was ranked 67 out of 180 countries in the Press Freedom Index by Reporters Without Borders claiming that the media in Fiji is still restricted by the Authority. On 20 June 2019, members of the opposition proposed the removal of the Authority, however the motion was defeated in Parliament. The Fijian Media Association in May 2022 called on the government to examine the "harsh penalties" imposed by the Authority describing it "too excessive and designed to be vindictive and punish the media rather that encourage better reporting standards and be corrective."

References

External links 

 Official website
 Media Industry Development Decree 2010

Communications authorities
2010 establishments in Fiji
Communications in Fiji